Lotte Kolson, previously known as K. S. Sulemanji Esmailji and Sons, is a Pakistani food company which is a subsidiary of South Korean conglomerate company Lotte Corporation. It is known for its Kolson brand. It is based in Karachi, Pakistan.

The company is known for the largest selling snack brand Slanty, and biscuits brand Bravo.

History
The company was founded in 1942 and was one of the first pasta makers in Pakistan.

In 2010, Lotte Corporation acquired the company and subsequently renamed it, Lotte Kolson.

In 2019, the company expanded their business and established a new factory in District Lahore, Punjab, Pakistan.

References

Lotte Corporation
Food and drink companies based in Karachi
Manufacturing companies based in Karachi
Pakistani subsidiaries of foreign companies
Food manufacturers of Pakistan
Food and drink companies established in 1942
1942 establishments in India
Mergers and acquisitions of Pakistani companies
2010 mergers and acquisitions
Privately held companies of Pakistan